James Burke may refer to:

Politics 
James F. Burke (politician) (1867–1932), United States Representative from Pennsylvania
James Burke (Australian politician) (born 1971), member of the Northern Territory Legislative Assembly
James Burke (Cork politician) (died 1936), Irish Cumann na nGaedhael politician and barrister 
James Burke (Roscommon politician) (died 1964), Irish Fine Gael politician and farmer
James A. Burke (New York politician) (1890–1965), New York City politician and Queens Borough President
James A. Burke (Massachusetts politician) (1910–1983), U.S. Congressman from Massachusetts
James Edmund Burke (1849–1943), American politician and Mayor of Burlington, Vermont

Sports 
James Burke (boxer) (1809–1845), English boxer
James Burke (cricketer) (born 1991), English cricketer
James Burke (19th-century footballer), 19th-century football player
James Burke (footballer, born 1994), English footballer
James Burke (Dublin hurler), inter county senior hurler with Dublin
James Burke (Kildare hurler) (born 1999), Irish hurler
James Burke (wrestler) (1936–2006), American Olympic wrestler
Jamie Burke (born 1971), baseball player
Jamie Burke (rugby union) (born 1980), American rugby union player
James Burke (baseball), American baseball player for the 1884 Boston Reds
Jimmy Burke (baseball) (1874–1942), American baseball player

Other fields 
James Burke (bishop) (1926–1994), American-born Catholic bishop in Peru
James Burke (science historian) (born 1936), British broadcaster, author, and television producer
James E. Burke (1925–2012), CEO of Johnson & Johnson
James Cobb Burke (1915–1964), American photographer and photojournalist
James Burke (actor) (1886–1968), appeared in The Maltese Falcon and numerous other films 
James Lee Burke (born 1936), American author
James Burke (gangster) (1931–1996), Irish-American gangster
E. James Burke (born 1949), justice of the Wyoming Supreme Court
James Burke (space engineer) (born 1925), lunar settlement and exploration expert, known for the Ranger program
James F. Burke (musician) (1923–1981), American cornet soloist

See also
James Burk (born 1948), sociologist and professor of sociology at Texas A&M University
Jim Burke (disambiguation)
Jimmy Burke (disambiguation)